William Henry Schneider (29 September 1934 – 9 May 1994) was a lieutenant general in the United States Army who served as Deputy Commander in Chief of United States Pacific Command. He earned a B.A. degree in business economics from St. Mary's University in 1955 and later received an M.A. degree in industrial management from George Washington University.

Personal
Born in San Antonio, Texas, Schneider was the son of Henry William Schneider (19 March 1906 – 24 March 1975) and Irene C. Mooty.

Schneider married Barbara Bristol Carver in 1957. The couple had four children.

After his death, Schneider was interred at Fort Sam Houston National Cemetery on 13 May 1994.

References

1934 births
1994 deaths
People from San Antonio
St. Mary's University, Texas alumni
United States Army personnel of the Vietnam War
George Washington University alumni
United States Army generals
Burials at Fort Sam Houston National Cemetery